Anurak Srikerd is a Thai football coach and former footballer and is the current manager of  Thai League 2 club  Kasetsart. He primary played as an attacking midfielder and was able to adapt as a striker. Besides, He is a former player of Thailand national team and scored 6 goals for the national team. He played in 10 qualifying matches for the 2002 FIFA World Cup.

Club career
In Thailand, he mainly played for two clubs. TOT FC and BEC Tero Sasana F.C. With BEC-Tero he won his biggest title at club level. He was twice champion and twice runner-up. Player of the Year in 2001, he contributed significantly to winning the championship. In 2002, he moved to the Woodlands Wellington FC to Singapore in the S-League. A serious knee injury made him difficult to create and he brought it to only 11 appearances and four goals this season. He then went to play back to Thailand again for BEC Tero. Having had played from 2004 to 2005 for the TOT FC, he signed a contract again in the S-League. This time at Home United FC, where already played two other compatriots with Sutee Suksomkit and Zdravko Marinkovic. With Home United FC winning the Singapore Cup in 2005. He stayed only one season at Home United and then went back to Thailand. In 2006, he played for TOT SC again.

International career
His national team career began in 1999. With the U23, they took part and won the Southeast Asian Games gold. In the same tournament he Scored his first goal for the national team in the dress. At 9–0 victory over the Philippines he scored six minutes after the 1–0. In 2000, he Participated with the national team at the Asian Cup and won with the team the King's Cup. In the final against Finland Anurak Scored three goals. The game ended 5–1

International goals

Managerial statistics

Honours

Player
BEC Tero Sasana
Thai Premier League: 2000, 2001–02
Kor Royal Cup: 2000

Individual
Thai Premier League Player of the Year (1): 2000

Manager
Bangkok Glass 
Thai FA Cup: 2014

Thailand U19
AFF U-19 Youth Championship: 2015

References 

1981 births
Living people
Anurak Srikerd
Anurak Srikerd
2000 AFC Asian Cup players
Anurak Srikerd
Anurak Srikerd
Anurak Srikerd
Anurak Srikerd
Woodlands Wellington FC players
Home United FC players
Expatriate footballers in Singapore
Singapore Premier League players
Anurak Srikerd
Association football midfielders
Anurak Srikerd
Anurak Srikerd
Anurak Srikerd
Anurak Srikerd
Anurak Srikerd
Southeast Asian Games medalists in football
Anurak Srikerd
Competitors at the 1999 Southeast Asian Games
Anurak Srikerd
Thai expatriate sportspeople in Singapore